The Charles Martel Society is an American white nationalist organization that publishes The Occidental Quarterly, a prominent scientific racist publication formatted to look like a peer-reviewed journal. It also publishes the Occidental Observer, which the ADL notes as a prominent online outlet for antisemitism. The Society also runs the book-publishing house the Occidental Press. It was founded in 2001 and is based in Atlanta, Georgia. It is classified as a hate group by the Southern Poverty Law Center.

History
The Charles Martel Society was founded as a nonprofit organization in 2001 by William Regnery II, an heir to the Regnery Publishing fortune. The organization is named after Charles Martel, who successfully defended Francia against an army of Muslim invaders at the Battle of Tours. It formed the basis for the National Policy Institute, which was founded by Regnery and some of his associates in 2005.

References

2001 establishments in Georgia (U.S. state)
Non-profit organizations based in Georgia (U.S. state)
Organizations established in 2001
White nationalist groups
White nationalism in the United States